Thalassococcus halodurans is a Gram-negative, strictly aerobic and halotolerant bacterium from the genus of Thalassococcus which has been isolated from the sponge Halichondria panicea from the Friday Harbor in the United States.

References 

Rhodobacteraceae
Bacteria described in 2007